The Anvil of Ice is a novel by Michael Scott Rohan published in 1986.

Plot summary
The Anvil of Ice is a novel in which Alv survives an attack on his town and becomes an apprentice smith making enchanted weapons.

Reception
Dave Langford reviewed The Anvil of Ice for White Dwarf #79, and stated that "Rohan clears the major hurdle of a trilogy opening: he actually makes me want to read book two! Stay tuned."

Reviews
Review by Brian Stableford (1986) in Fantasy Review, May 1986
Review by Barbara Davies (1986) in Vector 133
Review by Don D'Ammassa (1986) in Science Fiction Chronicle, #84 September 1986
Review by Baird Searles (1987) in Isaac Asimov's Science Fiction Magazine, May 1987

References

1986 novels